Tales from the Lush Attic, released in 1983, is the debut album by neo-progressive rock group IQ, following the cassette-only demo Seven Stories into Eight. It was also among the first neo-progressive releases, alongside Marillion's Script for a Jester's Tear, released in the same year.

In the style of some classic progressive rock albums, Tales from the Lush Attic consists of one epic song filling out almost an entire side of the original vinyl and shorter songs composing the other side.

The Giant Electric Pea 2006 re-release features a bonus track, "Just Changing Hands", which is credited as running for 5:12 but in reality is 10:18 long and features a hidden track, a short nameless exotic sounding instrumental.

Reception

In a retrospective review, Mike DeGagne of AllMusic commented that while the album is highly derivative of progressive rock-era Genesis, "there's an air to this album that gathers attention, especially on the synth-ridden passages." He praised the songs for running long enough for the listener to reflect on the playing, and the numerous unexpected changes in tempo. Paul Stump, in his History of Progressive Rock, commented that "the band are tight enough, and are redeemed by a sense of mission, self-belief and even fun", making particular note of the use of satire ("a commodity as rare as hen's teeth [in progressive rock]") in "My Baby Treats Me Right".

Track listing
All songs written by IQ.

Tracks 6, 7 and 9 of the 2013 Remix had previously been unreleased.

Personnel
Peter Nicholls – vocals
Mike Holmes – acoustic, electric & twelve-string guitars
Martin Orford – keyboards
Tim Esau – bass guitar
Paul Cook – drums, percussion

Production
Arranged and produced by IQ
Engineered and mixed by Mel Simpson
Remastered by Peter Van T'Riet

References

1983 albums
IQ (band) albums